The Canadian Professional Figure Skating Championships (known after 1998 as the Canadian Open pro-am competition) was an elite made-for-TV figure skating competition. It was created by Dick Button, a 2-time Olympic gold medalist, through his production company Candid Productions. It usually took place in December.  For most of its existence, it was an unsanctioned professional event, meaning that skaters who participated lost their eligibility to compete in the Winter Olympic Games and other "amateur" skating events controlled by the International Skating Union.

History
The first professional championship was held in 1994 in Hamilton, Ontario. Skaters competed in three disciplines: men's singles, ladies' singles, and pair skating. It was held again in 1995, 1996 and 1997 as a professional competition. In 1998 the competition was reworked to both include ice dancing for the first time and allow both amateur and professional skaters to compete against each other in a pro-am style competition. From 2000 to 2002 ice dancing was again not included in the events. The competition was last held in 2002 and was held in different Canadian venues and cities from year to year.

Professional champions

References
Information at goldenskate.com
Partial results on A Canadian Figure Skating Fan Page

External links
The Rise and Fall of the Pro Skating World
Skating Turns Pro part 1 part 2 part 3 part 4 part 5

Figure skating competitions
Figure skating in Canada

ja:世界プロフィギュア選手権
zh:世界职业花样滑冰锦标赛